Winnie the Pooh and the Honey Tree is a 1966 American animated featurette based on the first two chapters of Winnie-the-Pooh by A. A. Milne. The film was produced by Walt Disney Productions, and distributed by Buena Vista Distribution on February 4, 1966 as a double feature with The Ugly Dachshund. It was the last short film produced by Walt Disney, who died of lung cancer on December 15, 1966, ten months after its release. Its songs were written by the Sherman Brothers (Richard M. Sherman and Robert B. Sherman) and the score was composed and conducted by Buddy Baker.

Directed by Wolfgang Reitherman, it was the first animated featurette in the Winnie the Pooh film series, in which it was later added as a segment to the 1977 film The Many Adventures of Winnie the Pooh.

It had featured the voices of Sterling Holloway as Winnie the Pooh, Junius Matthews as Rabbit, Bruce Reitherman as Christopher Robin, Clint Howard as Roo, Barbara Luddy as Kanga, Ralph Wright as Eeyore, Howard Morris as Gopher, and Hal Smith as Owl. It was narrated by Sebastian Cabot.

Plot
One morning, Winnie-the-Pooh, a honey-loving anthropomorphic bear who live in the Hundred Acre Wood, does his stoutness exercise to help improve his appetite in order to gain weight, not lose it. He sees the cupboard and notices that there is a honey pot on one of the shelves. However, he is disappointed to find that it is empty. He hears a bee fly by and decides to climb a nearby honey tree, but as he reaches the beehive, a branch he is sitting on breaks, causing him to fall into a gorse bush below. Unwilling to give up his quest for honey, Pooh visits his best friend Christopher Robin and obtains a balloon from him, intending to use it to float up to the beehive. Before doing this, Pooh first rolls around in a mud puddle, hoping to trick the bees into believing he is a "Little Black Rain Cloud". When he reaches the beehive, Pooh pulls out some honey and eats it without noticing that it is covered in bees, who proceed to fly around in his mouth. He spits them out, kicking the queen bee into the mud puddle below. Shortly afterward, Pooh's disguise starts to drip, and the other bees start to attack him. The queen bee angrily flies up and stings Pooh on the bottom. The sudden hit causes Pooh to swing up and down; his bottom gets stuck in the beehive, amusing the queen bee. The other bees then shove Pooh out of the beehive, then his balloon string comes untied. After the balloon deflates and Pooh comes down, the bees chase both him and Christopher Robin away.

Still hungry for honey, Pooh decides to visit his friend Rabbit's house. Rabbit reluctantly invites Pooh in for lunch. Pooh greedily helps himself to all the jars of honey available. He then tries to leave, but finds he has grown too chubby to fit through the small passage Rabbit uses as a front door and gets stuck, with his head and arms outside Rabbit's house, his tummy wedged in the passageway, and his bottom and legs hanging inside on Rabbit's wall. When Rabbit finds Pooh stuck in the door, he tries to push Pooh's bottom through by himself, but cannot. He rushes off to get help and returns with Christopher Robin, while Owl tries to convince Gopher to dig Pooh out of the hole from the front. Gopher suggests blasting Rabbit's house open, but Owl refuses. When Rabbit returns with Christopher Robin, they both try to pull Pooh out, but fail. Christopher Robin suggests that they can push Pooh back inside if he and the others can't get him out. Rabbit refuses, even going so far as to wedge a chair under Pooh's rear end to prevent him from coming back into Rabbit's house. Christopher Robin decides that Pooh must wait without food until he is thin enough to fit through Rabbit's front door, no matter how long it may take. In the meantime, Rabbit decides to disguise Pooh's rear end, so he will not have to stare at it for months. He squeezes a frame around the chubby part, but when he tries to paint a moose's face directly on Pooh's bottom, the paint brush tickles him. Pooh giggles and wriggles his backside in surprise, messing up Rabbit's painting. Rabbit tries converting it into a shelf instead, but then Kanga and Roo visit Pooh and give him some honeysuckle flowers. These cause Pooh to violently sneeze, completely obliterating the shelf and decorations, much to Rabbit's dismay. After several days, Rabbit resigns himself to simply using Pooh's expansive bottom as the back of an armchair. He is also forced to put up a "Don't feed the bear!" sign outside by Pooh's head, after Pooh tries to get honey from his friend Gopher late one night.

Some time later, a depressed Rabbit leans against Pooh's bottom and feels him move a bit. Rabbit joyously summons Christopher Robin and his other friends to free Pooh. Rabbit pushes from inside, while everyone else pulls from outside, without success. Fed up with all this delay, Rabbit takes several steps backwards and shoves Pooh with a running start, causing Pooh to be launched into the air. He lands headfirst into the hole of another honey tree, scaring the bees away. Although his friends offer to free him, Pooh does not mind being stuck again, as he can now eat all the honey he likes.

Voice cast

Sterling Holloway as Winnie-the-Pooh, an anthropomorphic teddy bear who loves honey.
Junius Matthews as Rabbit, a rabbit who loves planting his vegetables in his garden.
Bruce Reitherman as Christopher Robin, a 7-year-old boy and Pooh's best friend.
Hal Smith as Owl, an elderly owl who loves to talk about his family.
Howard Morris as Gopher, a hardworking gopher who lives underground and often falls into his hole.
Clint Howard as Roo, Kanga's energetic young kangaroo.
Barbara Luddy as Kanga, a kangaroo and Roo's mother.
Ralph Wright as Eeyore, an old donkey who is always losing his tail and talks in a slow, deep, depressed voice.
Dallas McKennon and Ginny Tyler as the Bees (uncredited)
Sebastian Cabot as The Narrator

Production
Walt Disney first learned of the Winnie the Pooh books from his daughter, Diane. "Dad would hear me laughing alone in my room and come in to see what I was laughing at," Diane later recalled. "It was usually the gentle, whimsical humor of A. A. Milne's Pooh stories. I read them over and over, and then many years later to my children, and now to my grandchildren." As early as 1938, Disney expressed interest in obtaining the film rights to the Pooh books by first corresponding with the literary agency Curtis Brown. In June 1961, Disney acquired the film rights. By 1964, Disney told his animation staff that he was planning to make a full-length animated feature film based on the books. A meeting was held with senior staff members to discuss the proposed film. However, during the meeting, Disney decided not to make a feature film, but instead, a featurette that could be attached to a live-action film.

For the first featurette, Disney and his collaborators turned to the first two chapters of the first book, "In which we are introduced to Winnie-the-Pooh and some honey Bees, and the stories Begin", and "In which Pooh Goes Visiting and Gets into a Tight Place". The scene where Rabbit deals with Pooh's being part of the "decor of his home", was not from the original book, and was reportedly contemplated by Disney when he first read the book. Following the mixed reception of Alice in Wonderland (1951), he turned the project over to staff members who were nonchalant with the original stories. He selected Wolfgang Reitherman to direct the project in hopes he would Americanize the characters and include more humor. Reitherman cast his son, Bruce, to voice Christopher Robin. The character of Gopher, who does not appear in the original stories, was added to the cast. Because other "Nine Old Men" animators were working on The Jungle Book (1967), only Eric Larson and John Lounsbery were assigned to animate the characters. Other character animators such as Hal King, John Sibley, and Eric Cleworth were brought onto the project.

Music

All songs were written by Robert and Richard Sherman, who wrote most of the music for the Winnie-the-Pooh franchise over the years, subsequently incorporated into the 1977 musical film, The Many Adventures of Winnie the Pooh which is an amalgamation of the three previous Winnie-the-Pooh featurettes including "Honey Tree". The score, which was composed by Buddy Baker, drew inspiration from Sergei Prokofiev's Peter and the Wolf and had different instruments represent the characters: baritone horn for Pooh, bass clarinet for Eeyore, flute for Kanga, piccolo for Roo, clarinet for Rabbit, oboe for Piglet, French horn and ocarina for Owl, and bass harmonica for Gopher.

The insight and inspiration for the Pooh songs came from an unlikely source, as is explained in the Sherman Brothers' joint autobiography, Walt's Time:

In advance of the featurette's theatrical release, Disneyland Records released several LP albums accompanied by a read-along book. The first one, titled Walt Disney's Story of Winnie the Pooh and the Honey Tree, also known as the "Storyteller" version, was released in May 1965. It contained a narration of the story from Sebastian Cabot along with dialogue and sound effects from the featurette itself along with the songs. A second double-sided album was released which featured a soundtrack of the featurette's songs. Among those listed was "Mind over Matter" in which the characters encourage Pooh to think about getting thinner again. The song was later reworked into the "Heave Ho" song in the final film. Another song titled "Kanga's Lullaby" is sung by B. J. Baker, but according to historian Dave Smith, the song was added as extra material for the album.

Release
The film finished production in late 1965 and was released on February 4, 1966. The film held its world premiere in seven different theaters in three states. Five of the theaters held their world premieres in five different cities in Florida: Tampa, St. Petersburg, Clearwater, Gainesville, and Daytona Beach; and the two other theaters held their premieres at the State-Lake Theatre in Chicago, Illinois and the Fox Theatre in Atlanta, Georgia. It was later released throughout the United States days later, as a supplement to Disney's live-action feature The Ugly Dachshund.

The film was released in the United Kingdom almost two months later, also as a supplement to The Ugly Dachshund according to Britain's The Guardian, and held its British premiere (along with its supplement) at the Prince Charles Cinema located at the West End of London on March 20, 1966. It would later be included as a segment in The Many Adventures of Winnie the Pooh, which included the two further Pooh featurettes, released on March 11, 1977.

During the fall of 1966, Winnie the Pooh and the Honey Tree was re-issued for the second time in America, as a supplement to Disney's live-action feature The Fighting Prince of Donegal. Since the film became so popular in America, Winnie the Pooh and the Honey Tree was reused twice in local city theaters during 1967 as an extra feature to Lt. Robin Crusoe, U.S.N. in Spokane, Washington and The Adventures of Bullwhip Griffin in Philadelphia.

The film had its network premiere on March 10, 1970, as a television special on NBC. The film became a popular annual repeat for most of the decade until its last showing on November 25, 1977. That same year, NBC had also acquired the broadcasting rights to Winnie the Pooh and the Blustery Day, which premiered on November 30. Approximately five years later, Winnie the Pooh and Tigger Too also held its television premiere on NBC on November 28, 1975. Additionally, all three specials were sponsored by Sears, who was then the exclusive provider of Pooh merchandise.

On March 16, 1986, the featurette was shown for the first time on ABC as part of the Disney Sunday Movie television program along with two cartoons, a Chip 'n' Dale cartoon Chicken in the Rough (1951) and a Donald Duck with Chip 'n' Dale cartoon Chips Ahoy (1956). Originally on that day, the company was supposed to run Robin Hood (1973) but due to an ABC News special report on President Ronald Reagan's telecast speech on updated information about Nicaragua and Central America later that day, ABC decided to reschedule the film. They ended up playing Winnie the Pooh and the Honey Tree and the two cartoons afterward. Winnie the Pooh and the Honey Tree and the two cartoons were re-aired on ABC for the second time on September 7, 1986. The film later returned to NBC on January 21, 1990.

Winnie the Pooh and the Honey Tree was re-released in England multiple times throughout the 1970s and 1980s. The film was reissued in July 1976 as a supplement to the film Escape from the Dark, and in October 1985, the film was reissued again as a supplement to Peter Pan (1953). Winnie the Pooh and the Honey Tree would later held its British television premiere on ITV on June 14, 1986.

Cancelled theatrical re-release 
On December 5, 2011, Don Hall, who directed the 2011 Winnie the Pooh feature film, revealed that Disney originally planned to release a remastered version of Winnie the Pooh and the Honey Tree featuring scenes deleted from the original version. However, the idea was discarded in favor of a new film due to lack of enough deleted footage to "make it worthwhile".

Reception
The short initially received a mixed reception. Howard Thompson of The New York Times said that "[t]he Disney technicians responsible for this beguiling miniature have had the wisdom to dip right into the Milne pages, just the way Pooh paws after honey...The flavoring, with some nice tunes stirred in, is exactly right—wistful, sprightly, and often hilarious. Kenneth Tynan of The Observer felt "The sedate foolishness of Pooh is prettily captured, and there are very few offensive additions. Purists, however, will rightfully balk at such innovations as the stammering gopher and the songs, in one of which Pooh is made to sing:  'Speaking poundage-wise / I improve my appetite when I exercise. E. H. Shepard felt the replacement was "a complete travesty", and Felix Barker of The Evening News ran a campaign opposed to the change. A. A. Milne's widow, Daphne, is said to have liked it.

Winnie the Pooh featurettes
 Winnie the Pooh and the Honey Tree
 Winnie the Pooh and the Blustery Day
 Winnie the Pooh and Tigger Too
 Winnie the Pooh and a Day for Eeyore

See also
List of American films of 1966

References

Bibliography

External links
 

1960s English-language films
1966 short films
1966 animated films
1965 soundtrack albums
1960s musical comedy films
1966 comedy films
1960s Disney animated short films
Winnie-the-Pooh featurettes
Short films with live action and animation
Musicals by the Sherman Brothers
Animated films set in England
Animated musical films
Short films directed by Wolfgang Reitherman
Films produced by Walt Disney
Winnie the Pooh (franchise)
Films scored by Buddy Baker (composer)
American animated featurettes
1960s children's animated films
Films about sentient toys